Receptor-type tyrosine-protein phosphatase F is an enzyme that in humans is encoded by the PTPRF gene.

The protein encoded by this gene is a member of the protein tyrosine phosphatase (PTP) family. PTPs are known to be signaling molecules that regulate a variety of cellular processes including cell growth, differentiation, mitotic cycle, and oncogenic transformation. This PTP possesses an extracellular region, a single transmembrane region, and two tandem intracytoplasmic catalytic domains, and thus represents a receptor-type PTP. The extracellular region contains three Ig-like domains, and nine non-Ig like domains similar to that of neural cell adhesion molecule. This PTP was shown to function in the regulation of epithelial cell–cell contacts at adherens junctions, as well as in the control of beta-catenin signaling. An increased expression level of this protein was found in the insulin-responsive tissue of obese, insulin-resistant individuals, and may contribute to the pathogenesis of insulin resistance. Two alternatively spliced transcript variants of this gene, which encode distinct proteins, have been reported.

Interactions 

PTPRF has been shown to interact with Beta-catenin and liprin-alpha-1.

References

Further reading